Manon Gauthier is a politician and administrator in Montreal, Quebec, Canada. She served on the Montreal city council since November 2013, and was a member of the Montreal executive committee (i.e., the municipal cabinet) in Denis Coderre's administration throughout this time with responsibility for culture. Gauthier was previously the chief executive officer of the Segal Centre for Performing Arts from 2009 to 2013.

Gauthier retired from city council in August 2017.

Early life and career
Gauthier holds a Bachelor of Arts degree from Concordia University. She began her career in the arts and entertainment sector and later served as a vice-president of Weber Shandwick (2000–04) and as a senior vice-president of Cohn & Wolfe (2004–09).

Segal Centre CEO
Gauthier was recruited to serve as chief executive officer of the Segal Centre for Performing Arts by board chairperson Alvin Segal in autumn 2009. She has said that her primary responsibility was to take an organization "firmly and proudly" rooted in Montreal's Jewish community and make it a "multidisciplinary center, multilingual and open to the world." During this time, Gauthier also served as a board member of Culture Montreal and a member of the Governor General's Performing Arts Awards gala committee.

In December 2010, Gauthier was included in the Financial Post Magazine's listing of the one hundred most influential women in Canada. She resigned her position with the Segal Centre on June 1, 2013.

City councillor
Gauthier was a star candidate for Denis Coderre's party in the 2013 Montreal municipal election. During the campaign, Coderre described Gauthier as one of the "pillars" of his party and promised that she would receive the culture portfolio in his administration. Coderre was successful in the mayoral contest, and Gauthier won a narrow victory in the race for councillor in the Verdun division of Champlain–L'Île-des-Sœurs.

On November 18, 2013, Coderre appointed Gauthier to his executive committee with responsibility for culture, heritage, and design, the Space for Life, and the status of women. By virtue of her position on city council, Gauthier also serves a member of the Verdun borough council.

Gauthier announced in the summer of 2014 that Montreal would cut off its annual funding to the Montreal World Film Festival. She was quoted as saying that "various requirements were not met" following "countless discussions with the Festival's leadership." She further noted that public funds were at risk of being used to pay off the organization's debts, saying, "We are here to support creators, not creditors."

In December 2014, in her capacity as executive member responsible for Space for Life, Gauthier joined with representatives of Paris's National Museum of Natural History and Quebec City's Musée de la civilisation to sign a "Declaration on Biosphere Ethics," intended to cultivate "greater awareness and engagement on the part of their partners, employees and audiences with respect to geological, biological and cultural diversity."

In 2017, Gauthier led a three-day trade delegation to Los Angeles to promote Montreal's film industry.

She has championed an effort to name more of Montreal's streets, parks, and municipal buildings after prominent women, noting a strong gender imbalance in the existing names.

Electoral record

References

External links
City of Montreal page (in French)

Living people
Montreal city councillors
Concordia University alumni
Year of birth missing (living people)
Place of birth missing (living people)
21st-century Canadian politicians
Women municipal councillors in Canada
21st-century Canadian women politicians